Tom's BaoBao was a fast casual restaurant specializing in traditional hand-made bao. It was a subsidiary of Ganqishi, and opened its first location in Harvard Square, Cambridge, Massachusetts.

History 
Tom's BaoBao Harvard Square is the first international location of the Chinese fast-casual bao restaurant, Ganqishi and was founded in 2009. Boston was partly chosen as the site of the first location because it is a sister city to Hangzhou, the hometown of Ganqishi founder Tom Tong. A second location opened in Providence, Rhode Island on October 15, 2016. It closed its Providence location three years later, in August 2019. Its Harvard Square location closed in January 2020.

Menu 

The restaurant was known for serving baozi with a variety of fillings, including meat, vegetables, seafood, cheese and other ingredients. It offered a variety of specialty types, including dessert bao, vegan bao, and holiday-themed flavors like turkey pot pie.

It also served drinks such as Oolong tea, coffee, soy milk  and juices.

See also 

 List of Chinese restaurants

References

External links 
 

Fast casual restaurants
Chinese restaurants in the United States
Restaurants established in 2016
Companies based in Boston
Restaurant chains in the United States
Fast-food chains of the United States
2016 establishments in Massachusetts
Defunct restaurant chains in the United States